Tony Scroope (born 1984) is an Irish former hurler who played for Tipperary Championship club Burgess and at inter-county level with the Tipperary senior hurling team. He usually lined out in the full-forward line.

Career

Scroope first came to hurling prominence as a schoolboy with Nenagh CBS in the Harty Cup before later lining out with NUI Galway in the Fitzgibbon Cup. He simultaneously progressed through the various grades at club level and was a member of the Burgess team that won the Tipperary IHC title in 2005. Scroope first appeared on the inter-county scene as a member of the Tipperary minor hurling team that lost the 2002 All-Ireland minor final to Kilkenny. He progressed onto the under-21 grade where he once again lost out to Kilkenny in the 2004 All-Ireland under-21 final. After one year with the intermediate team, Scroope was drafted onto the Tipperary senior hurling team in 2004. He remained on and off the team over the following five seasons and won a Munster Championship medal as a member of the extended panel in 2009.

Honours

Burgess
Tipperary Intermediate Hurling Championship: 2005

Tipperary
Munster Senior Hurling Championship: 2009
Munster Under-21 Hurling Championship: 2003, 2004
Munster Minor Hurling Championship: 2002

References

External link
 Tony Scroope player profile

1984 births
Living people
University of Galway hurlers
Burgess hurlers
Tipperary inter-county hurlers